This is a list of Belgian football transfers for the 2012 summer transfer window. Only transfers involving a team from the Belgian Pro League are listed.

The summer transfer window will open on 1 July 2012, although some transfers took place prior to that date. Players without a club may join one at any time, either during or in between transfer windows. The transfer window ends on 31 August 2012, although a few completed transfers could still  only be announced a few days later.

Sorted by date

January 2012

February 2012

March 2012

April 2012

May 2012

End of 2011–12 season
After the end of the 2011–12 season, several players will return from loan to another club or will not have their contracts extended. These will be listed here, together with other players for which the date is also not specified.

June 2012

July 2012

August 2012

Sorted by team

Anderlecht

In:

Out:

Beerschot

In:

Out:

Cercle Brugge

In:

Out:

Charleroi

In:

Out:

Club Brugge

In:

Out:

Genk

In:

Out:

Gent

In:

Out:

Kortrijk

In:

Out:

Lierse

In:

Out:

Lokeren

In:

Out:

Mechelen

In:

Out:

Mons

In:

Out:

OH Leuven

In:

Out:

Standard Liège

In:

Out:

Waasland-Beveren

In:

 

Out:

Zulte Waregem

In:

 

Out:

Footnotes

References

Belgian
Transfers Summer
2012 Summer